Jorgina Porter (born 25 December 1987) is an English actress and model. She is known for portraying the role of Theresa McQueen in the Channel 4 soap opera Hollyoaks from 2008 until 2016 and again from 2020.

Early life
Porter was born in Trafford, Greater Manchester on 25 December 1987. She grew up with her mother and grandmother. A former ballet dancer, she was told by the ballet school she attended that she was overweight for a dancer. She later attended The Hammond School in Chester.

Career
In November 2008, it was announced that Porter had joined the cast of the Channel 4 soap opera Hollyoaks, playing the role of Theresa McQueen. Porter said that she was "thrilled" to join the cast and be a part of one of soap opera's "most notorious families". In 2010, Porter appeared with eight other soap opera actresses in a music video and cover of the Cyndi Lauper single "Girls Just Want To Have Fun". The song was released in aid of charity, Cancer Research UK's campaign "Race for Life".

Porter appeared in the November 2010 issue of Sugar magazine. In FHM's 100 Sexiest Women in the World 2011, Porter was ranked 50th. In August 2011, Porter took part in the ITV dance show Born to Shine. She learned to street dance on the show, but failed to make it to the final.

In 2012, Porter was confirmed to be a contestant and participant on the seventh series of Dancing on Ice. Porter was paired dancing with American pairs skater Matt Evers. Porter made it to the final and finished in second place behind Emmerdale actor  Matthew Wolfenden.

In 2013, Porter decided to leave Hollyoaks. In October that year, she said she was leaving the show at the end of her contract. After finishing filming on the show she appeared on the final series of Dancing On Ice in January 2014, which featured returning contestant 'All Stars' from past series. Porter and her skating partner Sylvain Longchambon were the first contestants to be voted off the series. In April, it was announced that Porter had agreed to return to Hollyoaks.

In 2014, she released her own calendar for 2015, showing some of her modelling shoots and photos. She has also released another calendar for 2016. Porter is the presenter for the Nintendo Girls Club. In July 2015, Porter announced that she was leaving Hollyoaks once again. Her final scenes as the character aired on 11 March 2016. In November 2015, Porter took part in the fifteenth series of ITV show I'm a Celebrity...Get Me Out of Here!. She came 5th on the show.

In 2016, Porter was cast as Miss Croft in a reboot episode of the series Are You Being Served?. She also became the new face of the UK advertising campaign for the skincare brand Proactiv. In 2017, she appeared as a contestant in Celebs Go Dating.

Modelling 
As an actress and model, Jorgie was chosen as the face of major international skincare brand Proactiv+ and was an ambassador for Teenage Cancer Trust's annual sun safety campaign. She appeared in the November 2010 issue of Sugar magazine. Along with then co-stars Rachel Shenton and James Atherton, they appeared on the cover of First Car Magazine, a magazine aimed at young drivers, in November 2011. She has also in men's magazine Loaded in 2009 and as the cover girl in 2011,

Porter celebrated being voted Hottest Female Soap Star by the readers of FHM UK Magazine in 2012 by appearing on the cover of the September issue of the magazine. She appeared topless (covered) with then co-star and boyfriend James Atherton in the September 2012 issue of Cosmopolitan magazine in support of a Breast Cancer.

Personal life
Porter is engaged to Oliver Piotrowski. In November 2021, she revealed that she had miscarried the couple's quadruplets. In June 2022, Porter announced her second pregnancy. In November 2022, she gave birth to a son.

Filmography

Awards and nominations

Notes

See also 
 List of Dancing on Ice contestants
 List of I'm a Celebrity...Get Me Out of Here! (British TV series) contestants

References

External links
 

1987 births
Living people
21st-century English actresses
Actresses from Manchester
People from Trafford (district)
English female models
English soap opera actresses
English television personalities
I'm a Celebrity...Get Me Out of Here! (British TV series) participants
People educated at Moorside High School